Scoggins is a surname, and may refer to:

 Charles Elbert Scoggins (born 1888), American writer
 Gustavus Scoggin, An American pioneer for which Scoggins Creek and Scoggins Dam is named after
 Jerry Scoggins (1913–2004), American country singer
 Mitchell Scoggins, American politician
 Myles W. Scoggins (21st century), 16th president of the Colorado School of Mines
 Tracy Scoggins (born 1953), American actress

Scoggins may also refer to: 
 Fictional village in Minnesota from Nelson Tethers: Puzzle Agent and Puzzle Agent 2.

See also

 Scroggins (disambiguation)

English-language surnames
Surnames of English origin
Surnames of British Isles origin
Surnames of North American origin